The blue-spotted Mexican tree frog (Smilisca cyanosticta) is a species of frog in the family Hylidae found on the Atlantic slopes of southeastern Mexico, Belize, and Guatemala, between Jalapa de Díaz in Mexico and Sierra del Mico in Guatemala. Its natural habitats are humid mid-altitude and montane forests, and it can also occur in secondary forest. Breeding takes place in temporary pools and streams and in depressions in logs that fill up with water. It is threatened by habitat loss and, potentially, chytridiomycosis.

References

 

Smilisca
Frogs of North America
Amphibians of Belize
Amphibians of Guatemala
Mexican tree frog
Near threatened fauna of North America
Near threatened biota of Mexico
Amphibians described in 1953
Taxonomy articles created by Polbot